Omoglymmius fulgens is a species of beetle in the subfamily Rhysodidae. It was described by R.T. & J.R. Bell in 1978.

References

fulgens
Beetles described in 1978